This article lists some of the modern completions of the Requiem by Wolfgang Amadeus Mozart.

Liturgical completions 
For the first performance of the Requiem in Rio de Janeiro on December 1819, Austrian composer Sigismund von Neukomm constructed a movement based on material in the Süssmayr version. Incorporating music from various movements (including the "Requiem aeternam", "Dies irae", "Lacrymosa", and "Agnus Dei"), the bulk of the piece is set to the "Libera me", a responsory text traditionally is sung after the Requiem Mass, and concludes with a reprise of the "Kyrie" and a final "Requiescat in pace". A contemporary of Neukomm and a pupil of Mozart's, Ignaz von Seyfried, composed his own Mozart-inspired "Libera me" for a performance at Ludwig van Beethoven's funeral in 1827.

The "Amen" fugue 
In the 1960s, a sketch for an "Amen" fugue was discovered, which some musicologists (Levin, Maunder) believed Mozart intended as a conclusion of the sequence after the "Lacrymosa". H. C. Robbins Landon argued that the "Amen" fugue was not intended for the Requiem, but rather "may have been for a separate unfinished mass in D minor" to which the Kyrie K. 341 also belonged.

There is, however, compelling evidence placing the "Amen" fugue in the Requiem based on current Mozart scholarship. First, the principal subject is the main theme of the Requiem (stated at the beginning and throughout the work) in strict inversion. Second, the fugue is found on the same page as a sketch for the "Rex tremendae" (together with a sketch for the overture of his last opera, The Magic Flute), and thus dates from late 1791. The only instance of the word "Amen" occurring in anything Mozart wrote in late 1791 is in the Requiem sequence. Third, as Levin points out in the foreword to his completion, the addition of the "Amen" fugue at the end of the sequence would maintain an overall pattern that closes each large section with a fugue, a design that appears intentional.

Many composers attempting a Requiem completion used the sketch for the "Amen" fugue discovered in the 1960s to compose a longer and more substantial setting for concluding the sequence. In the Süssmayr version, "Amen" is set as a plagal cadence with a Picardy third (iv–I in D minor) at the end of the "Lacrymosa". Only Jones and Suzuki combined the two, ending the fugue with a variation on the concluding bars of Süssmayr's "Lacrymosa" as well as the plagal cadence.

Completions since the late 20th century 
Since the 1960s several composers and musicologists, usually dissatisfied with the traditional "Süssmayr" completion, have attempted alternative completions of the Requiem. Each version follows a distinct methodology for the whole requiem or only for single movements.

Non-musicological completions 
Completions that didn't try to emulate Mozart's style, but rather, completed the requiem with the style of the editor.
 (2000) followed Süssmayr's completion until the "Sanctus" and "Benedictus", inserting 4 bars in piano for the "Sanctus", composing a double fugue for the Osanna with Sussmayr's theme, adding more modulations to the "Benedictus" and composing a transition back to D major.
Gordon Kerry (2005) was commissioned by the Australian Broadcasting Corporation to write a completion. He brought new additions to the manuscript but kept the overall proportions of Süssmayr's version.
Michael Finnissy (2011) used Süssmayr's orchestration as its basis but eliminated Süssmayr's compositions.
Brett Abigaña (2012) revised Süssmayr's version and provided a new "Amen" fugue.
Gregory Spears (2013) like Finnissy, included a new "Sanctus", "Benedictus", and "Agnus Dei" to replace the Süssmayr completion of those movements.

Partial completions 
Karl Marguerre (1962–2016) published an essay on Süssmayr's passages in 1962, replacing a few bars in the middle of the "Lacrymosa", "Sanctus", "Benedictus" and "Agnus Dei" with quotations from other Requiem movements, Marguerre also extended the instrumentation given by Süssmayr to include high woodwinds (oboe, clarinet, flute). His version was later republished by his granddaughter, Dorothee Heath, in 2016.
 (1978) replaced the "Amen", "Sanctus", and "Agnus Dei" with parodies of Mozart's earlier works. 
Emil Bächtold (1999) makes small additions and changes to Sussmayr's completion from the "Dies Irae" to the "Hostias", having the Lacrimosa only in fragmentary form and, similarly to Maunder, dispenses the "Sanctus", "Benedictus", "Agnus Dei" and the "Communio".
Timothy Jones (2014) followed a Levin-like approach in reworking the "Lacrimosa" and composing an extensive "Amen" fugue modeled on the "Cum Sancto Spiritu" fugue from the Great Mass in C minor, K. 427. He applied the same process to the "Sanctus" and "Osanna" fugue.

Full completions 
Marius Flothuis (1941) tried to repair shortcomings in Süssmayr's completion, such as the trombone solo in "Tuba mirum", use of trumpets, timpani, and trombones, and the key choice of the reprise of the "Osanna" fugue. Flothuis's completion was not published but was recorded by Jos van Veldhoven.
Franz Beyer (1971) revised Süssmayr's orchestration toward a more Mozartian style and introduced minor changes to Süssmayr's sections (e.g., slightly lengthening the "Osanna" fugue for a more conclusive-sounding ending). He preserved the two different keys of the "Osanna".
Simon Andrews (1985–2016) followed a similar method to Levin's but was less radical in adding new material, correcting Süssmayr's version in a much more conservative way, extending Osanna considerably, changing voice leading errors and adapting some of Süssmayr's additions. He was also the first to make changes to the Introit and to present a totally new orchestration for the Kyrie.
Richard Maunder (1988) rewrote the orchestration working from Mozart's autographs and eliminated Süssmayr's portions except for the "Agnus Dei" and the ending of the work ("Communio"). He recomposed the "Lacrymosa" from bar 9 onwards and incorporated a completion of the "Amen" fugue. For his instrumentation, he relied on comparable instances from Mozart's operas.
Duncan Druce (1991) made extensive changes to the orchestration focussing on the basset horns much more, retained Eybler's ninth and tenth measures of the "Lacrymosa", and substantially lengthened the movement to end in an extended "Amen" fugue. He also rewrote the "Benedictus" using the opening theme as its starting point, elaborating on it considerably longer than probably every other version.
H. C. Robbins Landon (1992) orchestrated parts of his completion using Eybler's partial work, thinking Eybler's work represents a more reliable guide of Mozart's intentions. He also fleshes out the "Amen" sketch.
Robert Levin (1993) retained the structure of Süssmayr's orchestration and contributions while adjusting orchestration, voice leading, and other instrumental passages, trying to match the instrumentation more to the practice in Salzburg. Other notable features included the completion of the "Amen" fugue and an extension of Süssmayr's "Osanna" fugue, following models of the Great Mass in C minor, K. 427. In an interview Levin gave to Arie Vardi he claimed to have changed the traditional completion "...as little as possible, so that it is not to disturb the weight of the centuries". 
Pánczél Tamás (2006) revised Süssmayr's score similar to Beyer but significantly extended the "Lacrymosa" past Süssmayr's passages to end in completion of the "Amen" fugue, and rewrote the "Benedictus" ending to lead into the "Osanna" reprise, as most completers did.
Clemens Kemme (2006–2009) rewrote the orchestration in a style closer to Eybler's, emphasizing the basset horns in particular, and reworking the "Sanctus", "Benedictus", and extended "Osanna" fugue.
Letho Kostoglou (2010) tried to fill the blanks of Mozart's manuscript in a similar vein and rhythmic patterns in completed works; unlike Gordon Kerry, he tried to keep his completion in a very close style to Mozart's.
Benjamin-Gunnar Cohrs (2013) provided entirely new instrumentation based on Eybler's ideas, new elaborations of the "Amen" and "Osanna" fugues, and a new continuity of the "Lacrymosa" (after bar 18), "Sanctus", "Benedictus", and "Agnus Dei", employing those bars which Cohrs speculated Mozart might have sketched himself.
Pierre-Henri Dutron (2016) revised Süssmayr's version. He rewrote the "Sanctus" and "Benedictus" from opening themes onward and took creative liberties concerning the vocals between the chorus and soloists. Conductor René Jacobs used Dutron's completion for performances in 2016.
R. C. Keitamo (2016–2018) provided a new orchestration influenced by motivic material from other late Mozart works, reworked the "Lacrimosa", and completed the "Amen" fugue. Like Maunder, this edition dispensed with Süssmayr's "Sanctus", "Osanna", and "Benedictus". The "Agnus Dei" was a parody of the Kyrie in D minor, K. 341, adapted to the Requiem's instrumentation.
Masato Suzuki (2017) followed a methodology similar to Robbins Landon but elaborated further on Süssmayr's sections. They also included a short "Amen" fugue, adding a basso obbligato to Mozart's primary material from the beginning.
Michael Ostrzyga, (2017–2020) commissioned by the Harvard Summer Chorus, Ostrzyga sifted Süssmayr's and Eyler's works to seek out Mozart's original intentions. He involves the performers by offering alternate versions to the movements which he deems potentially possible in Mozart's original vision, this includes an "Amen" fugue, a Sanctus in D minor, and a second "Osanna" fugue in B-flat major from Süssmayr's manuscript.

References

Modern
Masses by Wolfgang Amadeus Mozart
Mozart
1791 compositions
Compositions in D minor
Musical compositions completed by others
Compositions by Wolfgang Amadeus Mozart published posthumously